The 2021–22 Army Black Knights women's basketball team represent the United States Military Academy during the 2021–22 NCAA Division I women's basketball season. The Black Knights are led by 1st-year head coach Missy Traversi, and play their home games at Christl Arena in West Point, New York as members of the Patriot League.

Previous season
The Black Knights finished the 2021 season 9–11, 6–8 in Patriot League play to finish in third place in the North Division. They secured the sixth seed in the Patriot League Tournament, losing in the quarterfinals to American.

Roster

Schedule

|-
!colspan=9 style=| Non-conference regular season
|-

|-
!colspan=9 style=| Patriot League regular season

|-
!colspan=12 style=| Patriot League tournament
|-

Source

References

Army Black Knights women's basketball seasons
Army
Army Black Knights women's basketball
Army Black Knights women's basketball